Coming Soon is a 2008 Thai horror film starring Worrakarn Rotjanawatchra, Oraphan Arjsamat, Sakulrath Thomas, and Chantavit Dhanasevi. The film is the directorial debut for Sophon Sakdapisit, who was the co-writer of the films Shutter (2004) and Alone (2007).

Plot 
The movie starts with a scene of a movie where a woman named Chaba murders two of her three kidnapped children, only to be arrested by local villagers and hanged.

Shane and Som, in the movie audience, got traumatized by Shomba and start researching, finding out that this movie was based on a true event that happened 30 years ago.

Curious, they decide to check the house where this event occurred. While in the house, Shane falls off the stairs and gets heavily injured. At the hospital, they are questioned by the doctor on why they went to the house, to which they replied it was to investigate the report of Chaba's death. The doctor later tells them that Chaba hasn't died and is currently in a mental facility.

Shane decides to look at the film and see what has gone wrong. They find that the actress in the movie, Ingchan, has died instead of Chaba.

Later, Shane and Som gets haunted by Ingchan and later killed.

Production

Critical reception
Slasherpool felt that the film had some decent scary moments and that the script was sound. They noted that first-time director Sopon Sukdapisit might not have had a lot of experience, with some obvious flaws, and "rookie" mistakes, and nothing very innovative, suggesting that he stick to writing. The opined that it "is a movie destined to be remade"..."worth watching if you're in the mood for a decent ghost story but don't expect to get blown away."  When reviewed by Movie Exclusive, they summarized by saying "Coming Soon doesn't have enough to be an instant classic, but it bodes well for the GMM Tai Hub stable that they're still a force to be reckoned with when it comes to raking up the scares".  The Fridae Movie Club thought the film had promise when they wrote "Coming Soon has a sharp film-within-a-film concept, further proof of Sophon Sakdapisit’s screenwriting talents", but noted its lacks when writing "But the direction falls way short of the ambitious script."  This same opinion was shared by Fangoria, which wrote "Sakdapisit tosses in a few effective setpieces and plenty of gouged-out eyes, but the majority of Coming Soon feels overly familiar and illogical".

Additional sources
Review at Dlanz Movies
Review at Horror News

References

External links

2008 films
2008 horror films
Films set in a movie theatre
GMM Tai Hub films
Thai horror films
2008 directorial debut films
Thai supernatural horror films